Stefan Bakałowicz  (17 October 1857 – 1947) was a Polish painter from Warsaw, famous in the Russian Empire. He was noted for his paintings on the subjects of Ancient Rome. From 1936 he was a member of authorities of Polish Association of Artists – "The Capitol".
His father was the painter Władysław Bakałowicz.

Gallery

External links

Biography at the European Art Academy

19th-century Polish painters
19th-century Polish male artists
20th-century Polish painters
20th-century Polish male artists
1857 births
1947 deaths
Artists from Warsaw
White Russian emigrants to Italy
Emigrants from the Russian Empire to Italy
Imperial Academy of Arts alumni
Members of the Imperial Academy of Arts
Awarded with a large gold medal of the Academy of Arts
Polish male painters